Xie Tiao Tower is a Chinese tower located in Xuanzhou District of Xuancheng, Anhui. Alongside Yuejiang Tower, Zhenwu Pavilion and Zhenhai Tower, it is one of the Four Great Towers of Jiangnan.

History 
In 495, during the Southern Qi (479–502), Xie Tiao became governor of Xuancheng Commandery, he built a tower on Yangling Mountain (a part of Mount Jiuhua), and named it "Gaozhai".

In the Tang dynasty (618–907), local people rebuilt a tower "Beiwang Tower" in memory of Xie Tiao, commonly known as "Xie Tiao Tower". The tower became world famous after poet Li Bai's poems. In 874, local governor Dugu Lin rebuilt it and changed its name to "Diezhang Tower".

In the Jiajing period of the Ming dynasty (1368–1644), magistrate Fang Fengshi rebuilt the tower and reverted to its former name of "Gaozhai".

In the Kangxi EmperorKangxi period of the Qing dynasty (1644–1944), magistrate Xu Tingshi reconstructed the tower and renamed it "Gubei Tower". In the ruling of Guangxu Emperor, magistrate Lu Yiyuan reconstructed again and  reverted to its former name of "Xie Tiao Tower".

The tower completely destroyed in 1937 during the Second Sino-Japanese War. In May 1998, it was designated as a provincial cultural relic preservation organ by the Anhui Provincial People's Government.

References 

Towers in China
Tourist attractions in Xucheng
1997 establishments in China
Buildings and structures in Xucheng